The Special Astrophysical Observatory of the Russian Academy of Science (SAO RAS) is an astronomical observatory, set up in 1966 in the USSR, and now operated by the Russian Academy of Sciences. Based in the Bolshoi Zelenchuk Valley of the Greater Caucasus near the village of Nizhny Arkhyz, the observatory houses the BTA-6 and RATAN-600, an optical and radio telescope, respectively.

BTA-6 optical telescope 

The BTA-6's primary mirror has a diameter of 6 metres (236 inches) and is housed in a 48 m (157.5 ft) diameter dome at an altitude of 2,070 m (6,791 ft). It held the record from its completion until 1993, when it was surpassed by the Keck 1 telescope, Hawaii. Telescopes of comparable or larger size have subsequently employed flexible or segmented mirrors, and the BTA-6 remained the world's largest rigid-mirror telescope until the advent of spin-casting technology (which produced, for example, the single 8.4-meter primary mirror of the Large Binocular Telescope in the late 1990s). Its altazimuth mount dictates the need for a field derotation mechanism to maintain the orientation of the field of view.

Initial results were disappointing due to cracking of the first borosilicate mirror, which was replaced in 1978. The large housing dome and massive 42 tonne mirror make it difficult to maintain the telescope at a suitable constant temperature during observing sessions. Atmospheric turbulence caused by windflow over the nearby Caucasus peaks can lead to poor seeing at the site, and observations with an angular resolution better than an arcsecond are rare. Despite these shortcomings, the BTA-6 remains a significant instrument, able to image objects as faint as the 26th magnitude.

Other optical telescopes

Along with the BTA-6, the SAO operates two smaller telescopes at the BTA site, both built by Carl Zeiss AG. Both instruments are used in support of BTA-6 programs, as well as independent observation runs. On the advice of the SAO, programs originally booked for the BTA-6 can be moved to these telescopes, which takes up about 10% of their time.

The larger instrument, the 1 m Zeiss-1000, is located a few hundred meters from BTA-6 in its own building, which consists of a series of offices surrounding the main cylindrical instrument building with the dome on top. First light on the Zeiss-1000 was in 1990, and the installation, including additional instrumentation, was fully completed in 1993.

In 1994 they were joined by a 60 cm Zeiss instrument, formerly part of the Kazan State University's observatory. This is located only a few tens of meters from the Zeiss-1000, in a much simpler building consisting only of the dome and supporting masonry walls.

RATAN-600 radio telescope 

The RATAN-600 radio telescope (or the Academy of Science Radio Telescope), which consists of a 576 m diameter circle of rectangular radio reflectors, is also based at the observatory at an altitude of 970 m. (Coordinates .) Each of the 895 2×7.4 m reflectors can be pointed towards a central conical secondary mirror, or to one of five parabolic cylinders. Each reflector is combined with an instrumentation cabin containing various receivers and instruments. The overall effect is that of a partially steerable antenna with the resolving power of a 600 m diameter dish (when using the central conical receiver), making it the world's largest diameter individual radio telescope.

The telescope can operate in three modes:
 Two-mirror system: An sector of the ring focuses waves to a cylindrical secondary mirror and further onto the receivers
 Three-mirror system: The linear plane mirror reflects the waves to the south sector of the ring, which in turn focuses on a cylindrical secondary and onto the receivers (Periscope mirror of Kraus-type system)
 Entire ring: For observations near the zenith the entire ring can be used, together with the conical secondary mirror and its receivers
Independent observations at various discrete azimuths are possible simultaneously: For this a sector of the ring is used with one of the secondary mirror and receiver units, the later which can be positioned on railway tracks – meanwhile another sector in conjunction with another secondary mirror can be used for an independent observation.

The RATAN-600 is primarily operated as a transit telescope, in which the rotation of the earth is used to sweep the telescope focus across the subject of observation. Radio frequency observations can be made in the frequency band 610 MHz to 30 GHz, though primarily in the centimetric waveband, with an angular resolution of up to 2 arcseconds. Observation of the Sun at radio wavelengths, in particular of the solar corona, has been a long-standing focus of the RATAN-600's scientific programme. It has also contributed to radio observation for the SETI project. The RATAN-600 has not been dogged by the technical problems of the neighbouring BTA-6, and has generally been in high demand since its first operations in mid-1974.

See also 
 List of largest optical reflecting telescopes
 List of radio telescopes

References

References and further reading

External links
 SAO homepage (English and Russian)
 BTA-6 webcam
 Bolshoi Teleskop Azimutalnyi, by Bill Keel
 Satellite photo of RATAN-600 on Google Maps, centered on the centre of the telescope
 Satellite photo of BTA-6 on Google Maps, centered on the telescope

Astronomical observatories in Russia
Astronomical observatories built in the Soviet Union
Buildings and structures in Karachay-Cherkessia
Institutes of the Russian Academy of Sciences
Radio observatories